The Greystone Mansion, also known as the Doheny Mansion, is a Tudor Revival mansion on a landscaped estate with distinctive formal English gardens, located in Trousdale Estates of Beverly Hills, California, United States. Architect Gordon Kaufmann designed the residence and ancillary structures, and construction was completed in 1928. It was a gift from oil tycoon Edward L. Doheny to his son, Edward "Ned" Doheny, Jr. and his family. Following the purchase of the estate by the City of Beverly Hills in 1965, it became a city park in 1971, and was subsequently added to the National Register of Historic Places in 1976 as Doheny Estate/Greystone. The house and grounds are often used as locations for film and television shows. The house's descending staircase is one of the most famous sets in Hollywood.

Description
The 55-room,  Tudor-style former residence is on 16 acres (6.5 ha) of land. When it was built, it cost over $4 million (equivalent to about $ million in ) and was the most expensive home in California.

History
On February 16, 1929, four months after Ned Doheny, his wife Lucy and their five children moved into Greystone, Doheny died in a guest bedroom in a murder-suicide with his secretary, Hugh Plunkett. The official story indicated that Plunkett murdered Doheny either because of a "nervous disorder" or because he was angry over not receiving a raise. Others point out that Doheny's gun was the murder weapon and that Doheny was not buried in Los Angeles' Calvary Cemetery, a Catholic cemetery, with the rest of his family, indicating he had committed suicide. Both men are buried at Forest Lawn Memorial Park, Glendale, within a few hundred yards of each other. Both were involved in the trial of Doheny's father in the Teapot Dome scandal.

Doheny's widow, Lucy, remarried and lived in the house until 1955, when she sold the grounds to Paul Trousdale, who developed it into Trousdale Estates and sold the mansion to Chicago industrialist Henry Crown, who rented it to film studios. In 1963 Crown planned to subdivide the property and demolish the mansion. Beverly Hills stopped the demolition by purchasing the mansion in 1965. The estate became a city park on September 16, 1971, and on April 23, 1976, was added to the National Register of Historic Places. The city leased the mansion to the American Film Institute from 1965 to 1982 for $1 per year, hoping the institute would pay for repairs and upkeep.

Since 2002, the City of Beverly Hills has maintained a webpage for the park.

Current use

Greystone is now a public park and a location for special events, including the Beverly Hills Flower & Garden Festival. It is popular as a filming location due to its beauty, manicured grounds and Beverly Hills location. Some productions contribute to its upkeep and renovation. The 2007 film There Will Be Blood, loosely based on the life of Edward Doheny via the Upton Sinclair book Oil!, renovated its two-lane bowling alley to include it in the film.

In addition to numerous events that take place there, the mansion plays host each year to Catskills West, a theater arts and drama camp run by Beverly Hills Parks and Recreation, from mid-June to early August. The camp presents a play in the pool area twice during the summer.

The mansion is also a venue for the play The Manor, by Kathrine Bates, directed by Beverly Olevin, and produced by Theatre 40 of Beverly Hills, which takes place in various rooms. The audience is separated during the play to watch scenes in different orders. The Manor's plot is a fictionalized account of the Doheny family, including Doheny's involvement in the Teapot Dome scandal and his son's murder. It has been performed every year at Greystone Mansion since 2002, making it Los Angeles' longest-running play.

Shot on location

References

External links 

Greystone Mansion Website
Archived Greystone Mansion Website
Friends of Greystone Website

 

Houses in Beverly Hills, California
Gardens in California
Historic house museums in California
Open-air museums in California
Houses completed in 1928
Houses on the National Register of Historic Places in California
Buildings and structures on the National Register of Historic Places in Los Angeles County, California
Culture of Los Angeles
History of Los Angeles
Tudor Revival architecture in California
Dark Shadows